This article contains information about the literary events and publications of 1568.

Events
October – The Bishops' Bible (inscribed The Holie Bible) is published as a translation into English made under the authority of the Church of England.

New books

Prose
Wawrzyniec Grzymała Goślicki – De optimo senatore
Petar Hektorović – Ribanje i ribarsko prigovaranje (Discourse on Fishing and Fishermen)
Hans Sachs and Jost Amman (illustrations) – Das Ständebuch (Book of Trades)
William Turner
Of Sage
A New Boke on the Natures and Properties of all Wines
Giorgio Vasari – Le Vite delle più eccellenti pittori, scultori, ed architettori (Lives of the Most Excellent Painters, Sculptors, and Architects; revised edition)
Christopher Watson (translator) – The hystories of the most famous and worthy chronographer Polybius

Children
Niels Bredal – The Child's Mirror (in Danish)

Drama
Ulpian Fulwell – Like Will to Like
William Wager – The Longer Thou Livest, The More Foole Thou Art

Poetry
François d'Amboise – Élégie sur le trépas d'Anne de Montmorency
See also 1568 in poetry

Births
January 20 – Daniel Cramer, German Lutheran theologian (died 1637)
February 11 – Honoré d'Urfé, French novelist (died 1625)
March 30 – Henry Wotton, English diplomat and author (died 1639)
July 7 – Richard Burbage, English actor and theater owner (died 1619)
September 5 – Tommaso Campanella, Italian philosopher and poet (died 1639)
Unknown date – Richard Baker, English chronicler (died 1645)

Deaths
April 7 – Onofrio Panvinio, Italian historian (born 1529)
September 14 – Jan van Casembroot, Flemish humanist poet (executed, born c. 1525)
December 23 – Roger Ascham, English didact (born c. 1515)
Unknown dates
Antoine Héroet, French poet
Garcia de Orta, Portuguese Jewish physician, naturalist, and medical writer (born 1501/2)
Dirk Philips, Frisian Anabaptist theologian (born 1504)

References

Years of the 16th century in literature